First Lady or First Gentleman of Guam is the title attributed to the spouse of the governor of Guam. The current first gentleman is Jeffrey Cook, husband of Governor Lou Leon Guerrero, who has held the position since January 7, 2019.

List of first ladies and gentlemen of Guam

First ladies of American naval governors

First ladies of American military governors

First ladies of appointed civilian governors (1949–1971)

First ladies and gentlemen of elected governors (1971–present)

References